Shakespeare Songs may refer to

Music in the plays of William Shakespeare
Shakespeare Songs, songs by Madeleine Dring (1923-1977) 
Shakespeare Songs, songs by Virgil Thomson (1896-1989)
Shakespeare-Songs, cycle of German Lieder by Wolfgang Fortner (1907-1987)
Shakespeare Songs (Alfred Deller album), 1967